Nkem Akaraiwe (born 22 December 1996) is a Nigerian basketball player for First Bank and the Nigerian national team.

She participated at the 2018 FIBA Women's Basketball World Cup.

References

External links

1996 births
Living people
Forwards (basketball)
Nigerian women's basketball players